Kanwarjit Singh, popularly known by the name, Kanwarjit Singh Rozi Barkandi, is an Indian politician. He was a Member of the Legislative Assembly from Muktsar Assembly constituency in Sri Muktsar Sahib, Punjab in the years 2017-2022. He won the  2017 Punjab Legislative Assembly election and belongs to the Shiromani Akali Dal political party. He unsuccessfully contested the 2022 Punjab Legislative Assembly election. He was defeated by  Jagdeep Singh Kaka Brar of Aam Aadmi Party.

References 

Punjab, India MLAs 2017–2022
Year of birth missing (living people)
Living people
Shiromani Akali Dal politicians